Xanthus Russell Smith (February 26, 1839, Philadelphia, Pennsylvania – December 2, 1929, Glenside, Pennsylvania) was an American marine painter best known for his illustrations of the American Civil War.

Biography
Born in Philadelphia, Pennsylvania, the son of painters William Thompson Russell Smith and Mary Priscilla Wilson, he was educated at home by his mother, who also gave him drawing lessons. Between 1851 and 1852, he accompanied his parents and sister Mary Russell Smith on the family's tour of Europe. After returning home, he studied chemistry at the University of Pennsylvania, before enrolling at the Pennsylvania Academy of the Fine Arts. He served in the Union Navy as a captain’s clerk during the American Civil War, helping to maintain the blockade of Charleston, South Carolina. He saw little action, and sketched hundreds of ships in a variety of media, including pencil and oil paint, both for official purposes and for his own pleasure.

His father built a suburban villa, "Edgehill", in Glenside, Pennsylvania, a couple miles outside of Philadelphia, that included a large artist's studio. In 1879, Smith married Mary Binder, the daughter of a wealthy Philadelphia lumber dealer. The Smiths settled at Edgehill, where they raised their three children, Mary Russell "Polly" (1880–1938), Xanthus Russell Jr. (1886–1961), and George Russell (1890–1943). Smith also maintained a studio at 1020 Chestnut Street in Philadelphia for over thirty years, and painted until his death at age 90.

Selected works
Smith did not actually participate in most of the battles he illustrated; instead, he generally consulted those who were present at the engagements.  His first major work, The Monitor and the Merrimack — 1869, oil on canvas, 30 x 66 inches (76.2 x 167.6 cm.), Union League of Philadelphia — was critically acclaimed. His paintings were sometimes massive: Final Assault upon Fort Fisher, North Carolina — 1872–73, oil on canvas, 56 x 123-1/2 inches (142.2 x 313.7 cm.), Pennsylvania Academy of the Fine Arts — is more than 10 feet wide.

There are seven known versions of the famous June 19, 1864 naval battle between the USS Kearsarge and the Confederate ship Alabama, each a unique composition:
Sinking of the Rebel Cruiser Alabama by the U.S.S. Kearsage, 1868, oil on canvas, 10 x 18 inches (25.4 x 45.7 cm.), Collection of the Art Fund, Inc. at the Birmingham Museum of Art; Gift of Regions Bank
The Sinking of the Alabama, c. 1865–70, oil on canvas, 8.2 x 14.7 inches (20.8 x 37.3 cm.), private collection.
Battle between Kearsarge and Alabama, c. 1870, oil on canvas, 9-5/8 x 14-7/8 inches (24.4 x 37.8 cm.), Mariners' Museum, Newport News, Virginia.
The Kearsarge and Alabama, 1875, oil on canvas, 56-1/2 x 96 inches (143.5 x 243.8 cm.), Union League of Philadelphia. A popular attraction at the 1876 Centennial Exposition.
The Close of the Engagement, 1886, oil on canvas, 21 x 36 inches (53.3 x 91.4 cm.), Debra Force Fine Art, Inc., New York City.
Battle of the Kearsarge and Alabama, 1892, watercolor on paper, 19-3/4 x 29-3/4 inches (50.2 x 75.6 cm.), Morris Museum of Art, Augusta, Georgia. 
The Sinking of the CSS Alabama, 1922, oil on canvas, dimensions unknown, Franklin D. Roosevelt Presidential Library and Museum, Hyde Park, New York. Commissioned by former Assistant Secretary of the Navy Franklin D. Roosevelt .

Smith's paintings and sketches were used to illustrate a large number of Civil War histories, including the 1926 biography he wrote of his former commanding officer, Admiral Samuel Francis du Pont. Examples of his work are at the U.S. Naval Academy in Annapolis, Maryland, and the U.S. Naval Historical Center in Washington, D.C. Others are in the collections of the Metropolitan Museum of Art, the Museum of Fine Arts, Boston, the Columbus Museum of Art, the Delaware Art Museum, the Columbia Museum of Art, and the Addison Gallery of American Art. His unpublished autobiography, An Unvarnished Tale, along with his family papers are preserved in the Archives of American Art at the Smithsonian Institution.

References

James Louis Fisher, Xanthus Smith: Civil War Painter, M.A. thesis, University of Delaware, 1982.
Barbara McNew, "The Fury and Terrible Beauty." Naval History 14.3 (2001):26–33
Robert Wilson Torchia, Xanthus Smith and the Civil War, exhibition catalogue, Schwarz Gallery, Philadelphia, PA, April 1999.
Robert Wilson Torchia, The Smiths, Schwarz Gallery, Philadelphia, PA, January 1999.

External links

Cunard Steamer "Parthia" Leaving Boston Harbor (1871) from Cahoon Museum, Contuit, MA.
Farragut Passing the Forts below New Orleans (1872) from Philadelphia History Museum, Philadelphia, PA.
Landscape sketches from Harvard University Art Museum.
Landscape sketches from Princeton University Art Museum.
The Civil War Naval Scenes of Xanthus Smith from Independence Seaport Museum, Philadelphia, PA.

1839 births
1929 deaths
Artists from Philadelphia
19th-century war artists
People of Pennsylvania in the American Civil War
Pennsylvania Academy of the Fine Arts alumni
American marine artists
Union Navy sailors
People from Montgomery County, Pennsylvania
American war artists
Painters from Pennsylvania
19th-century American painters
American male painters
20th-century American painters
19th-century American male artists
20th-century American male artists